Atrichopogon is a genus of biting midges, small flies in the family Ceratopogonidae.

Some Atrichopogon (and Forcipomyia) species are ectoparasites on larger insects.

References 

 Borkent, A. 2011: World species of biting midges (Diptera: Ceratopogonidae).
 Felippe-Bauer, M.L. et al. 2012: Two new species of Atrichopogon Kieffer from Rio de Janeiro, Brazil (Diptera: Ceratopogonidae). Zootaxa 3566: 39–50. 
 Huerta, H. 2008: Description of a new species of the genus Atrichopogon Kieffer (Diptera: Ceratopogonidae) from Neotropical Mexico. Russian entomological journal, 17(1): 73-74.
 Huerta, H.; Dzul, F. 2012: Two new species of the genus Atrichopogon Kieffer (Diptera: Ceratopogonidae) from Mexico. Zootaxa 3557: 20–30. 
 Marino, P.I.; Tóthová, A.; Spinelli, G.R. 2011: Two new Patagonian species of Atrichopogon (Meloehelea) (Diptera: Ceratopogonidae). Zootaxa, 2777: 61–68.
 Spinelli, G.R.; Marino, P.I. 2007: A new Neotropical species of Atrichopogon Kieffer, and a redescription of A. casali Cavalieri & Chiossone (Diptera: Ceratopogonidae). Studies on Neotropical fauna and environment, 42(3): 203-209, 
 Spinelli, G.R., Marino, P.I. & Huerta, H. 2015. Revision of the Neotropical species of the subgenus Atrichopogon (Psilokempia) (Diptera: Ceratopogonidae). Zootaxa 4003 (1): 1–64. doi: 10.11646/zootaxa.4003.1.1. Preview (PDF)  (paperback);  (Online edition) 
 Szadziewski, R. 2001: European Atrichopogon of the subgenus Psilokempia (Diptera: Ceratopogonidae). Polish journal of entomology, 70: 359-374.
 Szadziewski, R.; Dominiak, P. 2009: Biting midges of the genus Atrichopogon Kieffer (Diptera: Ceratopogonidae) described by Kieffer from Taiwan. Zootaxa, 2239: 45-54.
 Tóthová, A.; Spinelli, G.R.; Marino, P.I. 2009: A new Nearctic species of Atrichopogon (Meleohelea) and a redescription of Atrichopogon (M.) chilensis Ingram & Macfie (Diptera: Ceratopogonidae). Zootaxa, 2023: 47-54
 Huang, E.; Cai, H.; Yang, A.; Lin, D.; Wang, G.; Yu, Y. 2009: Two new species of Atrichopogon (Diptera: Ceratopogonidae) from China. Oriental insects, 43: 365-367
 Wirth, W.W. & N.C. Ratanaworabhan, 1992: Two new oriental species of Atrichopogon related to A. jacobsoni (Diptera: Ceratopogonidae). Oriental Insects 26 (1): 265-274, 
 Yan, G.; Zhang, Y.; Yu, Y.-X. 1995: Five new species of the genus Atrichopogon from Tibet, China (Diptera: Ceratopogonidae). Contributions to epidemiology, 1: 96-103.
 Yu, Y-x. et al. 2005: Ceratopogonidae of China: Insecta, Diptera. Volume I. Military Medical Science Press, Beijing. 
 Yu, Y-x.; Yan, G. 2010: Two new species of biting midges (Diptera: Ceratopogonidae) from Yunnan Province, China. Sichuan journal of zoology, 29(2): 200-202.

External links 
 
 

Ceratopogonidae
Chironomoidea genera
Articles containing video clips